Roux as a culinary term indicates a mixture of flour and fat used as the basis of various sauces.

Roux may also refer to:

Places
 Roux, Belgium, a village in the province of Hainault
 Roux Island, Graham Land, Antarctica
 Cape Roux, Brabant Island, Palmer Archipelago, off the northwestern coast of the Antarctic Peninsula

People
 Roux family (marine painters), a family of French hydrographers and marine painters
Roux de Marcilly (died 1669), Huguenot conspirator
Albert Roux (1935–2021), French restaurateur
Alexander Roux, French émigré cabinet-maker
Ambroise Roux (1921–1999), French businessman
Anton Roux (born 1981), South African cricketer
Antoine Roux, French marine artist
Arsène Roux (1893–1971), French Arabist and Berberologist
Benoît Roux, American biophysicist
Carol Roux, American actor of the 1960s
César Roux (1857–1934), Swiss surgeon, eponym of the surgical procedure Roux-en-Y ("Y"-shaped Roux)
Claude Roux (born 1945), French lichenologist
Claude de Roux de Saint-Laurent (died 1689), French soldier, governor of Saint Christophe
Émile Roux, French physician and immunologist
Frédéric Roux, French footballer
Gilles Roux, inventor of the efficient Roux method for solving the Rubik's Cube
Georges Roux (1914–1999) Assyriologist
Guillermo Roux, Argentine painter
Guy Roux (born 1938), French footballer
Jacques Roux (1752–1794), French revolutionary
Jean Roux (1876–1939), Swiss herpetologist
Jean-Paul Roux (1925–2009), French Orientalist/historian
Jean-François Roux, Canadian politician
Jean-Louis Roux, Canadian entertainer and politician
Kenneth Roux, American virologist
Laëtitia Roux (born 1985), French ski mountaineer
Lionel Roux, French tennis player
Ludovic Roux, French skier
Luis Roux Cabral, Uruguayan chess player
Michel Roux (1941–2020), French restaurateur
Michel Roux Jr., French restaurateur
Michel Roux (actor), French actor
Michel Roux (baritone), French opera singer
Nolan Roux (born 1988), French footballer playing for Lille
Paul Hendrik Roux (1862-1911), South African protestant pastor and Boer War general
Sandrine Roux (born 1966), French footballer
Storm Roux, New Zealand association football player
Wilhelm Roux (1850–1924), German zoologist and embryologist

Other uses
Roux, pseudonym of the cartoonist Burton Silver
Roux Louka, female protagonist in the 1986 anime television series Mobile Suit Gundam ZZ

See also
 Roux culture bottle, a type of laboratory glassware used to grow microorganisms or tissue cells
 Leroux (disambiguation)
 De Roux, a list of people with the surname
 Harry A. Reoux (1901–1968), American politician
 Roux Method of solving a Rubik's Cube
 Robux, the virtual currency of Roblox